Garra kempi, the Kemp garra, is a species of ray-finned fish in the genus Garra from the Indian states of Arunachal Pradesh, Manipur, Meghalaya, Mizoram and Nagaland.

References 

Garra
Taxa named by Sunder Lal Hora
Fish described in 1921